Madhosh is a 1951 Bollywood film. The story was loosely based on Romeo and Juliet.

Cast 
 Manhar Desai  :  Raya
 Meena Kumari  :  Soni
 Usha Kiran  :  Raina
 Rajan  :  Anand
 Kuldeep Akhtar  :  Rambhaji, Raya's father
 Mubarak  :  Bhujba or Bhujwa, Soni's father
 Jilloo Maa (as Jiloo) :  Soni's mother and Bhujba's wife
 S. Nazir  :  Shakriya
 Habib Sandow  :  Pahadji
 Shivdutt  :  Vamia
 Bismillah (as Bismilla) :  Narayan
 Ramakrishna  :  Panditji (as Ram Krishan)
 Goldstein  :  Police Superintendent

Music 
All songs were written by lyricist Raja Mehdi Ali Khan
and music composed by Madan Mohan.

References

External links 
 
 Story synopsis

1951 films
Films scored by Madan Mohan
1950s Hindi-language films
Films scored by Vilayat Khan
Indian black-and-white films